Ian Kemish,  (born 1961) is an Australian author, international relations specialist and not-for-profit chair. He is a former senior diplomat and business executive. During his career with the Australian Government he served as Australian High Commissioner to Papua New Guinea, Australian ambassador to Germany, head of the consular and Southeast Asia Divisions of the Department of Foreign Affairs and Trade, and head of the Prime Minister's International Division. As of 2023 he is co-founder of international strategic advisory firm Forridel, adjunct professor in History at the University of Queensland, and an expert associate of the ANU National Security College. His book The Consul, released in July 2022, provides an insider account on more than 20 years of international crisis management by the Australian consular service.

Early life and education
Kemish was born in the United Kingdom and grew up in Australia and Papua New Guinea. He attended elementary school in Lae, Rabaul, and then Port Moresby, and secondary school in Darwin and Brisbane, Australia. Kemish graduated with Honours in modern Southeast Asian history from the University of Queensland. He began his career as a secondary school teacher, working with Aboriginal and Torres Strait islanders in Queensland. He speaks Indonesian, German, and Papua New Guinea Tok Pisin.

Career

Government

Kemish's 25-year diplomatic career included service as Head of the Australian Prime Minister's International Division from 2004 to 2005, Australian Ambassador to Germany and Switzerland from 2006 to 2009, and Australian High Commissioner to Papua New Guinea from February 2010 to March 2013.  

He served earlier as Head of the Southeast Asia and Consular Divisions at the Australian Department of Foreign Affairs and Trade, and in several other embassies in the Indo Pacific and Europe. Ian Kemish worked as a diplomat in Bosnia and other countries of former Yugoslavia during the conflict of the mid-1990s. 

Kemish was awarded membership of the Order of Australia for his leadership of Australia's emergency response to the 2002 Bali bombings, in his capacity as head of the Australian consular service and chair of the Inter-Departmental Emergency Task Force. His time as head of the consular service also included the September 11 attacks in the United States and a range of other high profile crises and individual cases. </ref>

Private sector
Kemish joined the private sector in 2013, taking on different leadership roles in the internationally focused resource sector, located in Washington and then Melbourne. In March 2020 he retired from the position of Chief People and Sustainability Officer at Newcrest Mining Limited where he had global accountability for sustainability, government and community relations, communications and human resources across Newcrest's jurisdictions in Australia, the Asia Pacific and the Americas. He oversaw Newcrest's adoption of an overarching sustainability framework, greenhouse gas emission reduction targets and new biodiversity protection standards .

Forridel
Kemish is a co-founder and director of Forridel, a strategic advisory business which helps a range of private and public sector clients negotiate challenges in the international environment, with a particular focus on the Indo Pacific region. His business activities also involve working with the Washington-based Bower Group Asia as a senior adviser, and as an associate with the London-based Ambassador Partnership.

Kemish is also actively engaged in the international development and not-for-profit sectors. He is a senior adviser to the Global Partnership for Education, where he supports GPE's partnerships with Australia, New Zealand and the Pacific. He is the chair of both the Kokoda Track Foundation, which promotes health, livelihood, education and leadership in PNG, and 3rd Space, which provides services to the homeless in his home city of Brisbane.

Academia
Kemish is also involved with a number of Australian universities and research institutes. He is an adjunct professor in history at the University of Queensland, where he also chairs UQ's ChangeMakers alumni engagement initiative. He is an expert associate at the Australian National University's National Security College, an honorary fellow at Deakin University, and a director of the Australia-Indonesia Centre at Monash University. He was a visiting fellow at the Lowy Institute of International Affairs from 2016 until 2023. 

Kemish writes regularly on Australian foreign policy and consular issues, with a particular focus on developments in the Indo-Pacific..

Awards and honours
Kemish was appointed a Member of the Order of Australia for his leading role in the Australian government's international task force that responded to the 2002 Bali bombings.

References

1961 births
Living people
University of Queensland alumni
High Commissioners of Australia to Papua New Guinea
Ambassadors of Australia to Germany
Ambassadors of Australia to Switzerland
Ambassadors of Australia to Liechtenstein
Members of the Order of Australia